The Schütte-Lanz D.I was a German single-seat biplane fighter, often said to be Germany's first biplane attack aircraft. The D.I was light-weight and made of wood covered in fabric, apparently based on the British design of the Sopwith Tabloid.

Operational history
After Idflieg testing in 1915, the plane was rejected on the grounds that the biplane design afforded less vision to the pilot than a monoplane and was as such unsuitable for use as a fighter. A modified version, the Schütte-Lanz D.II was produced in the same year.

Specifications

Bibliography
 William Green and  Gordon Swanborough. The Complete Book of Fighters.  Colour Library Direct, Godalming, UK: 1994.

Further reading

1910s German fighter aircraft
D.I
Rotary-engined aircraft
Biplanes
Aircraft first flown in 1915